Yang Tao may refer to:

Tao Yang, Chinese-American computer scientist
Yang Tao (speed skater), Chinese speed skater
, a rural commune of Lắk District, Đắk Lắk Province, Vietnam